The Bau language may be the:

Fijian language
Bau language (New Guinea)
Bau Bidayuh language (Borneo)
Kulang dialect of the Gaam language